Nagy Habib (born 1952), is professor of hepato-biliary surgery at Imperial College, London, and is known for devising radio-frequency based liver resection devices which remove liver tumour with minimal blood loss. His work has also focused on stem cells and gene therapy.

Early life and education
Nagy Habib was born in Cairo, Egypt, 1952. He trained under both  and the transplant surgeon Thomas Starzl.

Career
His work has focused on stem cells and gene therapy. He led the first clinical trial in the use of oncolytic adenoviruses for the treatment of liver cancer. It was carried out by means of a locally restricted injection into the main blood vessel to the liver. The findings were published in 2001. It was found to be safe, but the second phase of the trial did not find it effective. In 2004, he took stem cells from a person with liver cirrhosis and injected them into their liver artery, resulting in some improvement of liver function. 

In 2003 he was appointed professor of hepato-biliary surgery at Imperial College, London. In June 2007 he was appointed pro-rector for Commercial Affairs at Imperial. 

Habib developed several radio-frequency (RF) based liver resection devices. He devised the Habib RF device using the Habib needle, which has a modified version called the Habib 4X. It removes tumour with minimal blood loss. The procedure has come to be known as 'Habib's resection'.

MiNA Therapeutics, a biotechnology company dealing in small activating RNA technology was co-founded by Habib and his son Robert.

Awards and honours
He was awarded the Takreem award in December 2012, for his work in liver cancer and radio-frequency based liver resection.

Selected publications

Articles
 (Co-author)
 (Co-author)
 (Co-author)
 (Co-author)

Books

References 

1952 births
Living people
Egyptian surgeons
20th-century British medical doctors
21st-century British medical doctors
Egyptian emigrants to England
Physicians from Cairo
Physicians of Hammersmith Hospital
20th-century surgeons
Academics of Imperial College London